Zănești is a commune in Neamț County, Western Moldavia, Romania. It is composed of two villages, Traian and Zănești.

It is traversed by national road , which  connects Piatra Neamț to Bacău.

References

Communes in Neamț County
Localities in Western Moldavia